The British Hydromechanics Research Association is a former government research association that supplies consulting engineering over fluid dynamics.

History
It was formed on 20 September 1947 in Essex, under the Companies Act 1929

It had moved to Bedfordshire by the 1960s. In the 1970s it was known as BHRA Fluid Engineering.

Next door was the National Centre for Materials Handling, set up by the Ministry of Technology (MinTech), later known as the National Materials Handling Centre.

On 16 October 1989 it became a private consultancy.

Fluid engineering
The BHRA conducted most of the research for the aerodynamics of British power station infrastructure in the 1960s, such as cooling towers.

In 1966 it designed an early Thames flood barrier.

Computational fluid dynamics
It developed early CFD software.

Visits
On Tuesday 21 June 1966, the new Bedfordshire laboratories were opened by Duke of Edinburgh.

Structure
The organisation, Framatome BHR, is now in Cranfield in west Bedfordshire, near the M1.

See also
 Bierrum, has built and designed Britain's power station cooling towers since 1965, also in Bedfordshire.

References

External links
 BHR Group

1947 establishments in the United Kingdom
British research associations
Central Bedfordshire District
Computational fluid dynamics
Engineering research institutes
Hydraulic engineering organizations
Hydraulic laboratories
Research institutes established in 1947
Science and technology in Bedfordshire
Science and technology in Essex
Wind tunnels